Martín Rivas  is a 1925 Chilean silent film, the fourth film of Carlos F. Borcosque.

Cast
Juan Cerecer 		
Jorge Infante 	 		
Rafael Larson 			
Sílvia Villalaz

References

External links
 

1925 films
Chilean silent films
Films directed by Carlos F. Borcosque
Chilean black-and-white films